MagicWorld was a general entertainment channel on channel 162 produced for DStv by M-Net Series. The channel was initially used to simulcast programs such as Idols South Africa, and later went on to broadcast reruns of shows that were previously on other M-Net channels. However, due to multiple issues regarding signal and programming, the channel was later replaced with M-Net Family.

History
When Mnet's Open Time Prime Time block was closed they sought a new service to keep viewership of the popular programs in the block up. To do this they would need to be affordable to all families in order to do this. Dstv wanted to launch a scaled down package for low income households for the cost of R19.00. The second half of open time was kept for this new pay TV package and also wanted to launch with a service called Mnet Lite. Up to the end of the Open Time block this new offer was heavily advertised on the pay TV Terrestrial channel. A lot of secrecy was around this new channel and when launched it was a combination of rerun and first run content from Channel O and the rest of the Mnet Channels. From 2200 to 1100 the channel would simulcast completely with Channel O. It was also  launched to promote South African movies but later evolved into a fullscale General Entertainment Channel. Its prime time also has reruns but also contains the American reality show Starting Over. It still contains African produced movies during prime time.

2009
In 2009 the channel started simulcasting Mnet's New Youth Channel Vuzu's flagship program, V Entertainment. Whenever there is a major local reality program running it will broadcast on the channel like Idols in its entirety and later Big Brother Africa'''s weekly highlight show. When Dstv cut All Africa Poker, they moved it content to be broadcast on MagicWorld from 2230 to 0430 with Channel O picking up where they leave off all the way to 1100. It now also reruns popular Kenyan talk show, The Patricia Show.

2015
In 2015 the channel was rebranded as M-Net Family In an attempt to revive ratings. The channel had reruns of The Wild, The Talk and the kids block Koowee. Later in 2016 the channel had a program reshuffle leaving only The Talk'' as the only current program from the defunct MagicWorld. In 2017, M-Net Family was discontinued due to low ratings and programs from M-Net Family moved to Vuzu, with Zambezi Magic taking over the channel's former DStv EPG slot on 1 April 2019.

References

M-Net original programming